The Mujib Bahini, also known as Bangladesh Liberation Force (BLF), was an armed force formed during the Bangladesh Liberation War to fight against Pakistan in 1971.
The force was mainly composed of activists drawn from the Awami League and its student front, the Chhatra League. At its height, it had reportedly 13,000 members. It was organised with the active assistance of Major General Sujan Singh Uban of the Indian Army. Serajul Alam Khan and Sheikh Fazlul Haque Mani, Tofael Ahmed and Abdur Razzaq, MP were the organizers of this force.

1971 War of Independence
Mujib Bahini's exact involvement in the war is disputed, with Zafrullah Chowdhury stating, "The Mujib Bahini did not fight the liberation war." In 2014, A. K. Khandker was sued for accusing the Mujib Bahini of hooliganism and looting during the war in his book in his book 1971: Bhetore Baire.

Professor Serajul Islam Choudhury of Dhaka University opined that four unnamed leaders of Mujib Bahini were more successful at creating a rift between Sheikh Mujibur Rahman and Tajuddin Ahmad than Khandaker Mushtaq Ahmed, creating difficulties for Ahmad.

After 1971
After the Bangladesh Liberation War of 1971, the Mujib Bahini was merged with the auxiliary Jatiya Rakkhi Bahini, which became infamous for its own human rights abuses.

Recollection of former members
Zainal Abedin, a former student leader and a freedom fighter who crossed over to India in 1971 and joined the Mujib Bahini, reminiscing about how the Indian handlers and RAW agents treated them

Some former members were rewarded by the Indian government and decided to become Indian citizens themselves. Bimal Pramanik, the director of Centre for Research in India-Bangladesh Relations, was a former sector commander of Mujib Bahini. He fled Bangladesh in the aftermath of Mujib's assassination in 1975 and shifted to Kolkata in 1976; he has been living in the city since then.

See also
 Kader Bahini
 Human rights in Bangladesh
 Freedom of religion in Bangladesh

References

Bangladesh Liberation War
Mukti Bahini